Charles Van Enger (29August 18904July 1980) was an American cinematographer. In the 1920s Van Enger worked on all the silent films the German director Ernst Lubitsch made for Warner Bros. During the 1930s he worked in the British film industry. His later work was largely on supporting features for Universal Pictures and various independents.

Partial filmography

 The Great Redeemer (1920)
 The Last of the Mohicans (1920)
 Salomé (1923)
 Broadway After Dark (1924)
 The Phantom of the Opera (1925)
 Kiss Me Again (1925)
 Hogan's Alley (1925)
 Lady Windermere's Fan (1925)
 Why Girls Go Back Home (1926)
 Paradise (1926)
 Puppets (1926)
 Easy Pickings (1927)
 The Sea Tiger (1927)
 The Life of Riley (1927)
 The Port of Missing Girls (1928)
 The Head of the Family (1928)
 One Mad Kiss (1930)
 Meet the Wife (1931)
 Forgotten Women (1931)
 Help Yourself (1932)
 Money Means Nothing (1932)
 Turkey Time (1933)
 I Was a Spy (1933)
 Friday the Thirteenth (1933)
 Aunt Sally (1933)
 Forbidden Territory (1934)
 My Song for You (1934)
 Me and Marlborough (1935)
 In Town Tonight (1935)
 Boys Will Be Boys (1935)
 The Stoker (1935)
 Things Are Looking Up (1935)
 Soft Lights and Sweet Music (1936)
 Ménilmontant (1936)
 Where There's a Will (1936)
 Captain Bill (1936)
 Jack of All Trades (1936)
 The Bureaucrats (1936)
 San Francisco Docks (1940)
 Moonlight in Havana (1942)
 Who Done It? (1942)
 Sherlock Holmes Faces Death (1943)
 Frisco Sal (1945)
 That Night with You (1945)
 White Tie and Tails (1946)
 Abbott and Costello Meet Frankenstein (1948)
 Abbott and Costello Meet the Killer, Boris Karloff (1949)
 The Pecos Pistol (1949)
 Lorna Doone (1951)
 Sitting Bull (1954)
 Captain Kidd and the Slave Girl (1954)
 Khyber Patrol (1954)
 Gun Fever (1958)

References

Bibliography 
 Thompson, Kristin. Herr Lubitch Goes To Hollywood: German and American Film After World War I. Amsterdam University Press, 2005.

External links 

1890 births
1980 deaths
American cinematographers
People from Port Jervis, New York